The Elinore Pruitt Stewart Homestead, near McKinnon, Wyoming, United States, has significance dating to 1898. Also known as the Elinore and Clyde Stewart Homestead, it was listed on the National Register of Historic Places in 1985.

It is significant for representing "the long overlooked role of women homesteaders in the American West" and for its association with Elinore Pruitt Stewart's book, Letters of a Woman Homesteader, which was a basis for the 1979 film Heartland. Elinore Pruitt Rupert, the author-to-be, arrived in Wyoming in 1909 and filed for homestead property before marrying Mr. Stewart, whose own homestead filing was close by.
The homestead house on the property consists of a c.1898 log cabin and c.1909 additions.

References

External links
 National Register at the Wyoming State Historic Preservation Office

Houses completed in 1898
Houses on the National Register of Historic Places in Wyoming
Log cabins in the United States
Houses in Sweetwater County, Wyoming
National Register of Historic Places in Sweetwater County, Wyoming
Log buildings and structures on the National Register of Historic Places in Wyoming
1898 establishments in Wyoming